The Global Leaders Institute (GLI) is an executive education graduate school for social entrepreneurship in the arts headquartered in Washington DC with seasonal offices in Chile and Poland.

Academic Curators
The Global Leaders Institute offers a 12-month Executive MBA focused on social entrepreneurship, cultural management, sustainable impact, and community development. Courses are co-curated by nine institutions of higher learning: Harvard University, Duke University, Georgetown University, McGill University, New York University, Bard College, The Foundation Center, The League of American Orchestras and El Sistema (USA).

International Fieldwork
GLI Cohort Members carry out immersive fieldwork in 40+ countries annually on five continents.
Fieldwork site hosts include the Adelaide Symphony Orchestra, National Autonomous University of Mexico, Teatro del Lago, Universidad Austral de Chile, Gothenburg Symphony Orchestra, New Brunswick Youth Orchestra, Universidad Juárez del Estado de Durango, Verbier Festival, Fundación Azteca, Conservatory of Music of Puerto Rico, Metropolitan Youth Symphony, KIPP, Sphinx Organization, Fundación de Orquestas Juveniles e Infantiles de Chile, Universidad Catolica de Temuco, National Batuta Foundation, Society of the Four Arts, and the Richmond Symphony, among others.

History
Nigel Clarke, Jamaica's Minister of Finance and Public Service of Jamaica, is co-founding chair of The Global Leaders Program. In recent years, the GLP's annual Innovation Exchange Residence has taken place in Patagonia (Chile), Bielsko-Biala (Poland), and Palm Beach, Florida (United States). The GLP was established in 2013 with lead funding by The Hildegard Behrens Foundation as an affiliate of The Orchestra of the Americas Group. In the beginning of 2023 The Global Leaders Program has underwent rebranding into the Global Leaders Institute.

Notable faculty
Marin Alsop | Baltimore Symphony Orchestra & Vienna Radio Symphony Orchestra music director
Matthew Bishop | The Economist former New York bureau chief
Arthur C. Brooks | Harvard Kennedy School & Harvard Business School professor
Carla Dirlikov Canales | The Canales Project founder
Roberto Dañino | CXXXVIII Prime Minister of Peru
Hobart Earle | Odessa Philharmonic Theater music director
James Ehnes | Grammy Award winning Canadian violinist
Michael J. Feuer | National Academy of Education former president
Michael Gordon | Bang on a Can co-founder
Angel Gil-Ordoñez | PostClassical Ensemble co-founder & artistic director
Brian Seth Hurst | Emmy Award for Interactive Television co-creator
Marcus Johnson | NAACP Image Award laureate
William A. Haseltine | Harvard Medical School professor
David Kelley | The Atlas Society founder
David Ludwig | Curtis Institute of Music artistic dean
Albrecht Mayer | Berlin Philharmonic principal oboe 
Margaret Martin | Harmony Project founder
Michael McCarthy | London Oratory School Schola founder
Anne Midgette | The Washington Post former music critic
Hilda Ochoa-Brillembourg | Strategic Investment Group founding chairman
Adam Ockelford | author & researcher
Gabriela Ortiz | composer & Indiana University professor
Frank J. Oteri | International Society for Contemporary Music vice-president
Tom G. Palmer | Cato Institute senior fellow
Ernesto Palacio | Rossini Opera Festival general director
Panos Panay | Berklee College of Music director of innovation
Jasper Parrott | HarrisonParrott co-founder
Rafael Payare | Montreal Symphony Orchestra & San Diego Symphony music director 
Paolo Petrocelli | Coldplay cultural advisor
Gabriel Prokofiev | composer & Nonclassical founder
André de Quadros | Boston University professor & human rights activist
Nirupama Rao | XXVIII Foreign Secretary of India
Norman E. Rosenthal | Georgetown Medical School professor
Luis Szarán | Recycled Orchestra of Cateura founder
Doris Sommer | Harvard University professor
Alexandra Soumm | French violinist
Thomas C. Südhof | Nobel Prize laureate
Lars H. Thunell | The International Finance Corporation former CEO
Hugo Ticciati | Confidencen Sweden artistic director
Sergio Vela | Mexico's former Secretariat of Culture & Grupo Salinas artistic director
Mike Vranos | Ellington Management Group founding chairman
Veronica Wadley, CBE | London Arts Council chair & former editor of the Evening Standard
William Westney | author & Geneva International Music Competition laureate
Benjamin Zander | Boston Philharmonic Orchestra founder

Notable alumni
Toufic Maatouk | Abu Dhabi Music & Arts Foundation artistic director
 Claudia Curiel de Icaza | Secretariat of Culture of Mexico City (2022-)
 Maria Claudia Parias | National Batuta Foundation former president
 Nancy Usher | University of Nevada, Las Vegas dean of music
 Emmanuel Vukovich | Fischoff National Chamber Music Competition gold medalist
 Jonathan McCormick | Chicago Symphony Orchestra director of education
 Ignacio Barron Viela | Billings Symphony executive director
 Scott Wilson | Guildhall School conducting faculty

References

Master's degrees
Music education in the United States
Music education in Canada